The Suzuki Ertiga is a series of multi-purpose vehicles (MPV) manufactured by the Japanese carmaker Suzuki since 2012. The first-generation model is heavily based on the Swift while the second-generation model introduced in 2018 is made larger and based on the HEARTECT platform. A crossover-styled version was introduced in 2019 as a separate model called the Suzuki XL6 in India and Suzuki XL7 for worldwide markets. The largest markets for the Ertiga are India and Indonesia, where the model is mainly manufactured. The vehicle has also been exported to other South Asian and Southeast Asian markets, along with several markets in Africa, Middle East, Pacific Islands, Caribbean and Latin America.

The Ertiga has been rebadged by various carmakers throughout its history. The first-generation model was sold in Indonesia through Mazda dealership network by an OEM agreement as the Mazda VX-1 from 2013 until 2017, and was assembled and sold in Malaysia by Proton as the Proton Ertiga from 2016 until 2019. The second-generation model is also sold by Toyota as the Toyota Rumion since 2021.

The name "Ertiga" is coined from "R-tiga", a pronunciation of "R3" in Indonesian where "tiga" means "three" while "R" stands for "row", referencing its three-row seating capacity.



Powertrains

First generation (ZE; 2012) 

The Ertiga was previewed by the R-III (R3) concept car showcased by Maruti Suzuki at the 2010 Auto Expo. The production version of the car was unveiled at the 11th Auto Expo in New Delhi on 6 January 2012. It was launched in India on 12 April 2012 and in Indonesia on 22 April 2012. It became available in South Africa on 9 June 2014 and in the Philippines on 17 July 2014. Its development was led by chief engineer Toshikatsu Hibi. Maruti Suzuki proclaims it to be the first LUV (Life Utility Vehicle).

The first generation Ertiga is built on the Swift subcompact car platform. It was rebadged in Indonesia as the Mazda VX-1 from May 2013 until March 2017, and also assembled and sold in Malaysia as the Proton Ertiga, from November 2016 until August 2019. In its lifespan, the VX-1 only sold 1,640 units.

Markets

India 
According to Maruti Suzuki, the Indian Ertiga was designed specifically for Indian consumers, unlike the other Maruti models which were designed for the global market. Maruti has marketed it as a "Life Utility Vehicle". 11,000 of these vehicles were ordered in India within five days.

In India, the Ertiga is available in both the alternatives of diesel and petrol variants. Though both of these engines were also seen doing duties earlier in various models, they are tweaked and retuned specifically for the car to provide fitting performance figures for its customers. The diesel variant is available in VDi, ZDi and ZDi+ 1.5 grade levels, while the petrol variant is available in LXi, VXi ZXi and ZXi+ grade levels.

In June 2013, Maruti Suzuki added its Ertiga models with compressed natural gas (CNG). The Ertiga LXi and VXi have original factory converter kit and are provided with i-GPI (intelligent Gas Port Injection) which Maruti Suzuki claimed will achieve  premium-equivalent.

Indonesia 
The Indonesian market Ertiga is available in GA, GL and GX grade levels. Earlier models are only available with 5-speed manual transmission. On 29 January 2013, the GL and GX grades received chrome front grille and double blower air conditioner. The 4-speed automatic transmission is available for GL and GX grades from 17 May 2013.

At the 20th Indonesia International Motor Show in September 2012, three new concepts in the Ertiga's form are introduced, the Sporty, Luxury and Crossover version, which are actually Ertigas heavily modified into concept cars. The normal version, in this case the GX grade, also appeared. The Elegant version of the GX grade is available from August 2013. The Sporty was launched on 19 February 2014, which is based on the GL grade with a different front fascia and sporty body kit.

The Ertiga sold 109,461 units in two years, with selling record over Toyota Avanza in one year. The Ertiga is also offered in diesel variant, which is imported from India and only comes in manual transmission option.

Philippines 
In the Philippines, the Ertiga is offered in three grade levels: GA (with manual transmission only), GL (with either manual or automatic transmission) and GLX (with automatic transmission only).

South Africa 
The Ertiga is the brand’s first MPV-type vehicle in South Africa. However the company claims the Ertiga as a Life Utility Vehicle and also claims its aimed at being practical, while retaining the fun-to-drive characteristics on the popular Swift.

The Ertiga is the second made-in-India product in Suzuki South Africa’s portfolio, the first one being the older Alto (A-Star). The South African market Ertiga is only available with a 1.4-litre petrol engine paired with either 5-speed manual or 4-speed automatic transmission.

Facelift 
On 20 August 2015, the facelifted Ertiga was launched at the 23rd Gaikindo Indonesia International Auto Show. Changes consist of a wider grille, redesigned bumpers for all grades and a new trunk garnish exclusive to the GL and GX grades. The facelifted Ertiga was launched in India on 16 October 2015. Along with the diesel variants of the facelifted Ertiga comes with mild hybrid technology by Suzuki called as SHVS or Smart Hybrid Vehicle by Suzuki.

Ertiga Dreza 
On 8 January 2016, Suzuki launched the flagship variant of the Ertiga, called Dreza. It gets a different front fascia from regular variants, different wheel design and specific colour option. The interior gets a different seat upholstery, wooden panel on the dashboard and an 8-inch Android touchscreen audio system.

Proton Ertiga 

The Proton Ertiga is a rebadged Ertiga for the Malaysian market by Proton. It was launched on 24 November 2016, at the press conference at the Setia City Convention Centre, Setia Alam, Selangor. It is Proton's fourth model to be launched in a six-month span. It is Malaysia's first mini MPV that qualifies for Malaysia's EEV emissions standard. It can sit up to seven people, but because the middle row middle seat only features a lap belt, it is classified as a six-seater with a 2-2-2 configuration. It uses the same 1.4-litre petrol engine as the Suzuki Ertiga.

The Ertiga was updated in August 2018. It is now known as the Ertiga Xtra. The Executive Plus AT variant has been replaced with Premium AT. Changes included a darker upholstery for the seats and a 7-inch touchscreen head unit.

As with the launch of the second generation Suzuki-branded Ertiga, the future production of the Proton-branded Ertiga becomes unpredictable. In September 2019, the Proton Ertiga was discontinued.

Second generation (NC; 2018) 

The second-generation Ertiga was unveiled at the 26th Indonesia International Motor Show in Jakarta on 19 April 2018. It is built on the HEARTECT platform, with the development led by chief engineer Satoshi Kasahara. This generation is 130 mm longer, 40 mm wider and 5 mm taller than the outgoing model. The engine is also changed to bigger 1.5-litre unit for both petrol and diesel variants.

The Indian-built Ertiga is exported to South Asia, Africa and Middle East. While the Indonesian-built version is exported to the Southeast Asia, Pacific Islands, Caribbean and Latin America. It is also continued to be assembled in Myanmar for local market.

The facelifted model was appeared in April 2022. The exterior and interior received minor refreshments. Depending on the market, the engine, transmission, safety and convenience features are also improved.

Markets

India 
The second generation Ertiga was launched in India on 21 November 2018 and it is assembled locally by Maruti Suzuki. It is sold exclusively at Maruti Suzuki ARENA dealerships. The Indian market second generation Ertiga is available in eight grade levels (each engine version has four grade levels): LXi, VXi, ZXi and ZXi+ for the 1.5-litre petrol variant, and LDi, VDi, ZDi and ZDi+ for the 1.3-litre diesel variant. All grades are mated to a 5-speed manual transmission. The VXi and ZXi grades are also mated to a 4-speed automatic transmission. Both the petrol and diesel variants of the Indian market second generation Ertiga comes with mild hybrid technology by Suzuki called as SHVS or Smart Hybrid Vehicle by Suzuki. The petrol variants received TFT multi-information colour display. The automatic climate control air conditioner with digital display is only available for ZXi, ZDi, ZXi+ and ZDi+ grades. The LDi and LXi grades were discontinued in March 2019, while the 1.3-litre diesel variants were discontinued in August 2019.

The 1.5-litre diesel variant was made available since 30 April 2019. This engine is available in three grade levels - VDi, ZDi and ZDi+. It is mated to a 6-speed manual transmission. The engine was discontinued on 31 March 2020 due to the Bharat Stage 6 implementation.

The Indian market Ertiga received a facelift on 15 April 2022 with a newer K15C Dualjet mild hybrid powertrain and new 6-speed automatic transmission with paddle shifter option. The safety features are also upgraded with 4 airbags (front and side), ESP and HSA for higher grade levels.

Indonesia 
In Indonesia, the second generation Ertiga went on sale in May 2018. It is available in GA, GL and GX grade levels, the same grade levels as the first generation Ertiga. The GA grade is only available with 5-speed manual transmission, while the GL and GX grades are available with either 5-speed manual or 4-speed automatic transmission. The GX grade received beige interior with wooden pattern.

Improvements occurred on 15 February 2019. The GX grade received two-tone black polished alloy wheels, rear defogger, 6.8-inch touchscreen head unit from JVC with flatter bezels, automatic climate control air conditioner with heater and digital display, while the GL grade received fog lamps. GX and GL grades also received new foldable handgrips for first and second row plus additional hand grips in the third row.

The GX grade with Electronic Stability Program (ESP) was also exhibited as display units throughout 2018. The "Suzuki Sport (SS)" version of the second generation Ertiga was displayed as a concept at the 26th Gaikindo Indonesia International Auto Show in August 2018, with its production version launched on 22 March 2019, which is based on the GX grade, featuring a front mesh grille, sporty body kit, daytime running lights, black interior with wooden pattern, backup camera and also equipped with ESP as a standard feature. The Suzuki Sport body kit is available as accessories option in selected markets.

Another improvements occurred on 15 January 2020. The GX grade received black interior with wooden pattern and an 8-inch touchscreen head unit, while the GL grade received air conditioner with digital display. Along with the Suzuki Sport version, the GL and GX grades also received armrest in the second row. A Pearl Glorious Brown colour was replaced by Brave Khaki colour for GL and GX grades. The GA grade only received new foldable handgrips for first and second row plus additional hand grips in the third row.

The limited-edition Suzuki Sport Finest Form (FF) variant was unveiled on 11 November 2021 and only limited to 125 units. The car is based on Suzuki Sport variant with new cosmetics upgrades such as dual tone white and black colour, red accents on the exterior, new blackened grille, seats with red accents and additional smart  rear view E-Mirror from XL7 Alpha.

The facelifted Ertiga for the Indonesian market was launched on 10 June 2022. The GA, GL and GX grades received an updated grille design, while the SS grade reusing the pre-2019 alloy wheels from GL grade but refreshed with two-tone polish colour, all grades also received shorter antenna. A mild hybrid powertrain (marketed as "Smart Hybrid") became standard in GX and SS grade levels. The interior also refreshed with full black colour for all grades, carbon pattern and seats with red stitches for SS grade, 8-inch LCD display for GL grade and new instrument cluster for GX and SS grades. The GX and SS grades also received cruise control, hill-hold assist (automatic only), ESP and auto retractable mirror.

Philippines 
The second generation Ertiga was launched in the Philippines on 23 January 2019. It is offered in three grade levels: GA (with manual transmission only), GL (with either manual or automatic transmission) and GLX (with automatic transmission only). The Ertiga received updates in the Philippines in March 2020. The facelifted Ertiga was launched on 16 January 2023.

South Africa 
The second generation Ertiga was launched in South Africa on 8 March 2019. It is offered in GA and GL grade levels.

Thailand 
The second generation Ertiga was launched in Thailand in February 2019. The Thai market Ertiga comes with black interior, which was later used on the Suzuki Sport version and an updated 2020 model GX grade of the Indonesian market Ertiga.

Safety 

The Ertiga for India received 3 stars for adult occupants and 3 stars for toddlers from Global NCAP in 2019 (similar to Latin NCAP 2013).

Gallery

Toyota Rumion 

The Indian-built second-generation Ertiga is rebadged and marketed by Toyota as the Toyota Rumion, which is offered as an entry-level MPV model in various African countries. The "Rumion" nameplate was previously used for the Japanese market Corolla Rumion hatchback. It debuted in October 2021 in South Africa, which the model is offered in S, SX and TX grade levels. It was also introduced in Egypt in January 2022.

XL6/XL7 

The Maruti Suzuki XL6 in India, Suzuki XL7 elsewhere, and the Suzuki Ertiga XL7 in Mexico, is a crossover-inspired derivative of the second-generation Ertiga. Its development was led by chief engineer Masayuki Ishiwata. The XL6 was launched in India on 21 August 2019 and sold exclusively at NEXA dealerships. The XL7 was launched in Indonesia on 15 February 2020, in the Philippines on 18 March 2020, in Thailand on 2 July 2020, and in Mexico on 8 October 2020 as the Ertiga XL7.

The Indian market XL6 is available in three grade levels: Zeta, Alpha and Alpha+, with either manual or automatic transmission. Unlike the 7-seater Ertiga, the XL6 is a 6-seater, referring to its name. The international market XL7 retains its 7-seat capability.

In Indonesia, it is available in three grade levels: Zeta, Beta and Alpha, with either manual or automatic transmission. The Philippine and Thai market XL7 only has one grade level: GLX, mated to a 4-speed automatic transmission. XL6 and XL7 stands for "Xtra Large 6-seater/7-seater". The Ertiga XL7 for the Mexican market is imported from Indonesia.

According to Suzuki, the XL6/XL7 has over 200 component differences from the regular Ertiga. Apart from the changes on the exterior, the other components were the engine control module, body control module, redesigned fuel tank shape for better center of gravity and retuned suspensions.

The Indian market XL6 received a facelift on 21 April 2022 with a newer K15C mild hybrid powertrain.

Sales

Ertiga

XL6/XL7

References

External links 

  (Ertiga)
  (XL7)

Ertiga
Cars introduced in 2012
2020s cars
Mini MPVs
Compact MPVs
ASEAN NCAP small MPVs
Global NCAP small MPVs
Front-wheel-drive vehicles